USS Scott (DDG-995) was a  of the United States Navy. She was named for Rear Admiral Norman Scott, who was killed during a surface action at the First Naval Battle of Guadalcanal (sometimes referred to as the Battle of Friday the 13th) aboard USS Atlanta, winning a posthumous Medal of Honor for his actions.

Originally named Nader, Scott was ordered by the Shah of Iran, but was undelivered at the time of the Iranian Revolution and the U.S. Navy elected to commission her and her sister ships for service in the Persian Gulf. The destroyers were equipped with heavy-duty air conditioning and were also well suited to filtering sand and the results from NBC warfare. She was commissioned in 1981.

Scott completed a major re-fit in Philadelphia in 1988 that focused on upgrading its radar and fire control tracking system.

Scott was decommissioned from the U.S. Navy on 10 December 1998.

Current status
Scott was sold to the Republic of China in 2004, originally to be named Chi Te. However, due to her better storage condition than her sister ships, she became the first Kidd class vessel to be commissioned by the Republic of China Navy (ROCN) and thus became ROCS Kee Lung (DDG-1801), the lead vessel of the new ROCN Kee Lung-class destroyers.

After almost two years of refit and training in the U.S., the Kee Lung was commissioned on 17 December 2005 at Keelung naval port in northern Taiwan. The ROCN paid just over $690 million for the four Kidd-class destroyers, giving it extensive AAW capabilities.

References

External links
Navysite.de page
Unofficial site

Kidd-class destroyers
Ships built in Pascagoula, Mississippi
1980 ships
Cold War destroyers of the United States